The Yapen languages are the branch of Malayo-Polynesian languages spoken on Yapen Island and the nearby isle of Cenderawasih Bay, both in Papua province of northeastern Indonesia. 

They share Yapen Ιsland with the Papuan Yawa languages.

Languages
The Yapen languages are: 
East: Kurudu, Wabo.
Central–Western: Ambai, Ansus, Busami, Munggui, Marau, Pom, Papuma, Serui-Laut, Wandamen, Woi.

References

South Halmahera–West New Guinea languages
Languages of western New Guinea
Yapen Islands
Papua (province) culture
Ambai Islands
Cenderawasih Bay